Michael A. Canavan is a retired United States Army lieutenant general and former Federal Aviation Administration security official.

Canavan presently sits on the board of defense contractor USfalcon.

Canavan commanded Special Operations Command Europe and the Joint Special Operations Command, and retired after serving as the chief of staff for the United States European Command. On the morning of September 11th, he was in Puerto Rico and had failed to designate a replacement. In the wake of the September 11 attacks Canavan resigned his position as Associate Administrator for Civil Aviation Security at the FAA amid controversy over Air Marshal assignments to Bush Administration Cabinet members and confidence in his leadership.

As a major general Canavan led the team in Croatia that recovered and identified the bodies from the 1996 crash of an Air Force CT-43, which killed the Commerce Secretary, Ronald H. Brown.
 

Canavan is married to Ambassador Katherine Canavan.

References

External links
Testimony to the 9/11 Commission

Living people
Members of the United States Army Special Forces
United States Army generals
Year of birth missing (living people)